Eugenio Castellotti (10 October 1930 – 14 March 1957) was a Formula One driver from Italy.

Driving career
Castellotti was born in Lodi, Italy. He acquired a Ferrari at the age of twenty, from a local benefactor, and began racing sports cars in 1952. That year he won the Portuguese Grand Prix, was third at Bari and second at Monaco which was run that year for sports cars. In 1953 he won the 10 Hours of Messina and finished third in the Carrera Panamericana in Mexico. In 1954, he signed for Lancia and again drove sports cars whilst awaiting the team's Grand Prix car. He eventually made his Grand Prix debut at Buenos Aires on 16 January 1955, for Lancia, but struggled in the warmer temperatures and crashed.  However, he finished second at Monaco, but in mid-season the team amalgamated with Scuderia Ferrari, for whom Castellotti drove for the remainder of his career. He participated in 14 World Championship Grands Prix, achieving 3 podiums and scored a total of 19.5 championship points. He secured pole position, with Lancia, at the 1955 Belgian Grand Prix, becoming the youngest driver to do so (at age 24 years, 7 months and 26 days), a record that stood for 13 years until Jacky Ickx's pole position at the 1968 German Grand Prix.

He also participated in several non-Championship Formula One races. Castellotti won the March 1956 12 Hours of Sebring at Sebring, Florida partnered with Fangio. He followed this triumph by winning the Mille Miglia race in Brescia and the Grand Prix for sports cars in Rouen, France. Castellotti's Ferrari achieved a total race time  of 2 hours 10 minutes 31.1 seconds, winning the race. He was also second in the Nürburgring 1000 km race again partnered with Fangio.

Known for his sophisticated manners and tailored clothes, Castellotti had significantly prominent media profile in Italy for his relationship with ballerina and actress Delia Scala. Castellotti and Scala were officially engaged at the time of his death.

Death
Castellotti died at 26 years old during a private Ferrari test session at the Modena Autodrome. Castellotti was testing a new Ferrari Grand Prix car for the 1957 season. He hit a high kerb at a chicane and was thrown out of the car; his body was hurled . He had just been told to accelerate so that he could average 85.127 miles per hour (136.999 km/h). The car turned over several times and finished up in the members stand. No one else was injured. Doctors said Castellotti died instantly from a fractured skull.

Legacy
Castellotti was considered the greatest Italian driver since Alberto Ascari. In 1958, Castellotti's friend Giuseppe Corsi founded Scuderia Castellotti in Lodi to honour his memory. The team used modified Ferrari Tipo 553 2.0-litre engines bored out to 2.5 litres and rebranded as "Castellotti", with "Eugenio" on the cam covers. The cars were easily distinguishable from other F1 T51s in that their exhausts were fitted on the left, while all other engines used in T51s had their exhausts on the right. The team competed in four events in 1960 with Italian drivers Gino Munaron, Giorgio Scarlatti and Giulio Cabianca. Cabianca scored the team's first championship points by finishing fourth at the 1960 Italian Grand Prix. The team folded in 1961 after Cabianca fatally crashed in the same autodrome where Castellotti had his accident. Castellotti's legacy has been honoured by Club Auto Moto Storiche Castellotti in Lodi.

Major career wins (sportscars):
1952: Coppa d'Oro di Sicilia
1952: Portuguese Grand Prix
1953: Circuito di Senigallia
1956: Mille Miglia
1956: 12 Hours of Sebring
1957: 1000 km Buenos Aires

Racing record

Complete Formula One World Championship results
(key) (Races in bold indicate pole position)

Non-championship results
(key) (Races in bold indicate pole position)
(Races in italics indicate fastest lap)

''† Indicates shared drive with Luigi Musso

References

External links
 The dashing Milanese that stayed young forever. Article on Castellotti at 8w

1930 births
1957 deaths
People from Lodi, Lombardy
Italian racing drivers
Italian Formula One drivers
Lancia Formula One drivers
Ferrari Formula One drivers
24 Hours of Le Mans drivers
Racing drivers who died while racing
Sport deaths in Italy
World Sportscar Championship drivers
12 Hours of Sebring drivers
Sportspeople from the Province of Lodi
Carrera Panamericana drivers